Zeelaf or Zilaf is a raga in Hindustani classical music. It is a pentatonic melody (i.e. containing only 5 svaras) is composed of the following svaras : Sa Ga Ma Pa Dha. It is performed very rarely. Zeelaf also employs the subtle GM -> S meend. It is from the Asavari Thaat. But it is played in the Bhairav aang also. Zeelaf has been used by Qawwals and Khayals.

History
Amir Khusru, the father of Qawwali, is said to have created about twelve new melodies or ragas, among which is Zeelaf.

References

External links
 Blog on ragas

Hindustani ragas